The Chorleywood bread process (CBP) is a method of efficient dough production to make yeasted bread quickly, producing a soft, fluffy loaf. Compared to traditional bread-making processes, CBP uses more yeast, added fats, chemicals, and high-speed mixing to allow the dough to be made with lower-protein wheat, and produces bread in a shorter time. It was developed by Bill Collins, George Elton and Norman Chamberlain of the British Baking Industries Research Association at Chorleywood in 1961. , 80% of bread made in the United Kingdom used the process.

For millennia, bread had been made from wheat flour by manually kneading dough with a raising agent (typically yeast) leaving it to ferment prior to baking. In 1862 a cheaper industrial-scale process was developed by John Dauglish, using water with dissolved carbon dioxide instead of yeast. Dauglish's method, used by the Aerated Bread Company that he set up, dominated commercial bread baking for a century until the yeast-based Chorleywood process was developed.

Some protein is lost during traditional bulk fermentation of bread; this does not occur to the same degree in mechanically developed doughs, allowing CBP to use lower-protein wheat. This feature had an important impact in the United Kingdom where, at the time, few domestic wheat varieties were of sufficient quality to make high-quality bread; the CBP permitted a much greater proportion of lower-protein domestic wheat to be used in the grist.

Description
The Chorleywood bread process allows the use of lower-protein wheats and reduces processing time, the system being able to produce a loaf of bread from flour to sliced and packaged form in about three and a half hours. This is achieved through the addition of Vitamin C, fat, yeast, and intense mechanical working by high-speed mixers, not feasible in a small-scale kitchen.

Flour, water, yeast, salt, and fat (if used) are mixed together, along with minor ingredients common to many bread-making techniques, such as Vitamin C, emulsifiers and enzymes. The dough is then mechanically mixed for about three minutes. The high-shear mixing generates high temperatures in the dough, which is cooled in some advanced mixers using a cooling jacket. Chilled water or ice may also be used to counteract the temperature rise during high-speed mixing.  Air pressure in the mixer headspace can be controlled to keep gas bubbles at the desired size and number. Typical operating regimes are pressure followed by vacuum, and atmospheric followed by vacuum. The pressure control during mixing affects the fineness of crumb texture in the finished bread.

In typical high-volume bread-production, the dough is cut into individual pieces and allowed to "recover" for 5–8 minutes (intermediate proofing). Each piece of dough is then shaped, placed in a baking tin and moved to the humidity- and temperature-controlled proofing chamber, where it sits for about 45–50 minutes. It is then baked for 17–25 minutes at 450 °F (about 230 °C). After baking, the loaves are removed from the baking tin and then go to the cooler, where, about two hours later, they are made ready for despatch, sliced and packaged if required. In UK-standard bread, the dough piece is "cross-panned" at the moulding stage; this involves cutting the dough piece into four and turning each piece by 90° before placing it in the baking tin. Cross-panned bread appears to have a finer and whiter crumb texture than the elliptical shape of the crumb bubble structure resulting from a different orientation, is easier to slice, and tends to be more resistant to tearing when spreading products such as butter on the surface.

, 80% of bread made in the United Kingdom, Australia, New Zealand, and India, used the process. Many smaller bakers use the CBP to mix their dough which they then process by hand.

Since the introduction of the process, many UK domestic wheat varieties have been improved. Flour suitable for traditional high-quality pan bread (12%–13.5% protein) can now be sourced in the United Kingdom. Before the development of the CBP, UK bread was reliant on imported wheat, particularly from North America.

Criticism
In the book Not on the Label: What Really Goes Into the Food on Your Plate (2004), Felicity Lawrence wrote that the industrial scale of the Chorleywood Bread Process comes at a nutritional cost, requiring larger amounts of salt and yeast than traditional bread recipes. Andrew Whitley in his book Bread Matters: The State of Modern Bread and a Definitive Guide to Baking Your Own criticises the CBP for the inferior flavour and texture of the bread made in this way.

The Chorleywood process has been shown to increase symptoms of irritable bowel syndrome, compared to traditional forms of making bread.

References

External links
 The Federation of Bakers

Baking industry
Breads
1961 introductions
Food processing industry in the United Kingdom
Science and technology in Hertfordshire